John Cantius (or ; 23 June 1390 – 24 December 1473) was a Polish priest, scholastic philosopher, physicist and theologian.

Biography
John Cantius was born in Kęty, a small town near Oświęcim, Poland, to Anna and Stanisław Kanty. He attended the Kraków Academy at which he attained bachelor, and licentiate. In 1418 he became a Doctor of Philosophy. Upon graduation he spent the next three years conducting philosophy classes at the university, while preparing for the priesthood.

Upon his ordination, he became rector at the school of the Canons Regular of the Most Holy Sepulcher in Miechow. While there, he was offered a professorship of Sacra Scriptura (Holy Scripture) back at his alma mater, the Kraków Academy, which would later be named the Jagiellonian University. He attained a doctorate in theology and eventually became director of the theology department. He held the professorship until his death in 1473. Cantius spent many hours copying manuscripts of the Holy Scriptures, theological tracts, and other scholarly works.

In physics, he helped develop Jean Buridan's theory of impetus, which anticipated the work of Galileo and Newton.

During his time in Kraków, Cantius became well known in the city for his generosity and compassion toward the poor, especially needy students at the university. He subsisted on what was strictly necessary to sustain his life, giving alms regularly to the poor. He made one pilgrimage to Jerusalem and four pilgrimages on foot to Rome.

Michael Miechowita, the medieval Polish historian and Cantius's first biographer, described Cantius's extreme humility and charity; he took as his motto:
Conturbare cave: non est placare suave,
Infamare cave; nam revocare grave.
(Beware disturbing: it's not sweetly pleasing,
Beware speaking ill: for taking back words is burdensome.)

He died while living in retirement at his alma mater on 24 December 1473, aged 83. His remains were interred in the Collegiate Church of St Anne, where his tomb became and remains a popular pilgrimage site. He is the patron of the diocese of Bielsko-Żywiec (since 1992), and of the students.

Veneration
John Cantius was beatified in Rome by Pope Clement X on 28 March 1676. He was named patron of Poland and Lithuania by Pope Clement XII in the year 1737. Ninety-one years after his beatification, John Cantius was canonized on 16 July 1767, by Pope Clement XIII.

The Roman Breviary distinguishes him with three hymns; he is the only confessor not a bishop who has been given this honor in the Catholic liturgy.

St. John Cantius is a popular saint in Poland.  A number of churches and schools founded by Polish diaspora communities throughout North America are named in his honor, in cities as far-ranging as Cleveland, Ohio; Winnipeg, Manitoba; Detroit, Michigan; Chicago, Illinois; Rolling Prairie, Indiana, Milwaukee, Wisconsin; St. Cloud, Minnesota; Wilno, Minnesota, Philadelphia, Erie, and Windber, Pennsylvania; New York City and Buffalo, New York.

"John Cantius" has been used as a first and middle name—see, for example, John Cantius Garand.

In 1998, a new religious institute was founded, based in Chicago, which took St. John Cantius as their patron saint. Thus they are the Canons Regular of Saint John Cantius.

Feast day

When St. John Cantius's feast day was first inserted into the General Roman Calendar in 1770, it was initially assigned to 20 October, but in the calendar reform of 1969 it was moved to 23 December, the day before the anniversary of his death, which occurred on Christmas Eve 1473. Those who, as authorized by Pope Benedict XVI in Summorum Pontificum, use the 1962 Roman Missal continue to celebrate it on 20 October as a III Class Feast.

See also
Canons Regular of Saint John Cantius
St. John Cantius Church (Chicago)
St. John Cantius Church in the article on Wilno, Minnesota
Saint John Cantius, patron saint archive

References

External links

Biography from the Canons Regular of Saint John Cantius
Bull of Canonization (1767) by Pope Clement XIII
Novena to Saint John Cantius
Biography at The Catholic Forum
Patron Saints Index: Saint John Cantius
The Saints: A concise Biographical Dictionary, (ed. John Coulson), Hawthorn Books, Inc. 1960

Polish Roman Catholic theologians
15th-century Polish Roman Catholic priests
Polish Roman Catholic saints
Jagiellonian University alumni
1390 births
1473 deaths
Medieval Polish saints
15th-century Christian saints
Academic staff of Jagiellonian University
People from Oświęcim County
15th-century Polish writers
15th-century mathematicians
Venerated Catholics
Canonizations by Pope Clement XIII